The Punjab Right to Service Act is an Act of Government of Punjab, India that came into force on 20 October 2011. The objective of this Act is to deliver services to the people of the state within time limits. This Act was enacted on the recommendations of Punjab Governance Reforms Commission.

Services covered under Punjab Right to Service Act
The Government of Punjab has notified 351 services under Punjab Right to Service Act 2011 vide notification no: 5/27/2014-2GR-2/425953/1 dated 02.03.2015 and no. 5/27/2014-2GR-2 (PF)/668042/1 dated 15.01.2016.Initially number of services covered under the Act was 206  which was  increased to 351 vide above mentioned notification no dated 15-01-2015. As per Act delivery of these services has been made time bound. In case of delay the concerned official(s) will be answerable to the authorities and affected person(s) may appeal to the designated officers/Appellate Authority.For this purpose First Appellate Authority, Second Appellate Authority has also been notified.

List of Services and Appellate Authorities

Simplified application proforma
To avail the services a standardised and simplified application proforma was introduced for the convenience of the citizen. Earlier there were not only different types of proformas in different offices to avail these services but they varied also from district to districts. In addition to it earlier a lot of undesired documentation was involved in old proformas which was curtailed and documents specifically related to the service only were made mandatory in the simplified proformas. Specimen of the simplified proforma is given below:
Simplified proforma for Services under RTS Act.

Citizen Service delivery Centres

Punjab Government has developed a network of Service Centres (Punjabi ਸੇਵਾ ਕੇਂਦਰ). 2,147 service delivery centres are being developed to provide these services at the distance of 10 km in rural and 1.5 km in urban areas. Out of these 1,758 Centres and 389 are in urban areas.

References

External links
www.pbgrc.or  

Simplified proforma for Services under RTS Act.

Government of Punjab, India
Indian legislation